Răzvan Neagu (born 25 May 1987) is a Romanian former football player.

Statistics 

Statistics accurate as of 1 November 2011

Career honours

SC Vaslui
 Cupa României
 Runner-up: 2010
 UEFA Intertoto Cup
 Winner: 2008

External links
 
 
 

1987 births
Living people
Sportspeople from Bacău
Romanian footballers
FC Vaslui players
FCM Bacău players
ACF Gloria Bistrița players
FC Petrolul Ploiești players
Liga I players
CS Turnu Severin players
Association football forwards